Jean Nicolay (27 December 1937 – 18 August 2014) was a Belgian footballer who played as a goalkeeper. He earned the Belgian Golden Shoe in 1963 while at Standard Liège. He made 39 caps for the national team between 1959 and 1967, his debut being a 0–2 friendly defeat to Austria on 24 May 1959.

Nicolay played between 1955 en 1969 with Standard Liège, where he won the Belgian Champsionship in 1958, 1961, 1963 and 1969, and the Belgian Cup in 1966 and 1967. In 1969 Nicolay transferred to Daring Club de Bruxelles. Later he also played at Royal Tilleur. After retiring from football, Nicolay was goalkeepers coach with Standard Liège, Mechelen, Metz, the Swiss national football team and the Belgium national football team.

Honours

Club 
Standard Liège

 Belgian First Division: 1957-58, 1960-61, 1962-63, 1968-69
 Belgian Cup: 1964–65 (finalists), 1965–66 (winners), 1966-67 (winners)

Individual 

 Belgian Golden Shoe: 1963
 Ballon d'Or nomination: 1964
 Knight of the Walloon Order of Merit: 2014

References

Belgian footballers
Belgium international footballers
Standard Liège players
Belgian Pro League players
1937 births
2014 deaths
Association football goalkeepers
R. Daring Club Molenbeek players
RFC Liège players
Standard Liège non-playing staff
FC Metz non-playing staff
Footballers from Liège